KCMI (97.1 FM) is a radio station broadcasting a Christian radio format. KCMI is licensed to serve the community of Terrytown, Nebraska, United States. The station is currently operated under Christian Media Incorporated.

Broadcasting
CMI (Christian Media Incorporated) has offices located in Scottsbluff, NE, and broadcasts on 97.1 FM, with translators 93.5 FM in Sidney and 99.1 FM in Rushville.

Programming
KCMI features both Christian teaching and music. The standard music played on KCMI is worship/praise, as well as some contemporary Christian hits.  The station also has special programs dedicated to music aimed towards children, Classic Christian music, hymns, Christian pop, and Christian rock. The station also carries nationally syndicated programs, such as Point of View, Focus on the Family, Haven Today, and Adventures in Odyssey.

References

External links
KCMI website

CMI
Moody Radio affiliate stations
Radio stations established in 1981
1981 establishments in Nebraska